Anabel Ochoa (1955–2008) was a Spanish writer and psychiatrist.

References

1955 births
2008 deaths
Basque women writers
20th-century Spanish women writers
Spanish psychiatrists
People from Bilbao
Spanish women psychiatrists